1966 saw Racing Club win the league title, it would be their last national title for 35 years. Argentina played in the 1966 FIFA World Cup, reaching the quarter-finals.

League table

Relegation

There was no relegation after the decision to suspend relegation in preparation for the new Nacional and Metropolitano system.

Copa Libertadores

Two teams qualified for Copa Libertadores 1967, Racing Club as champions and River Plate as runners-up

Copa Libertadores 1966
River Plate: Runners up
Independiente: Semi-finalist
Boca Juniors: Semi-finalist

Argentina national team
World Cup
1966 FIFA World Cup: Quarter finalist

References

Argentina 1966 by Osvaldo José Gorgazzi at rsssf.
Copa Libertadores 1966 by Martín Tabeira at rsssf.

 

pl:I liga argentyńska w piłce nożnej (1966)